Massalongia griseolobulata is a species of lichen in the family Massalongiaceae. Found in the Tristan da Cunha–Gough Island, it was described as a new species in 2010 by Norwegian lichenologist Dag Øvstedal. The type specimen was collected from the lower slopes of Tafelkop on Gough Island). The species is known only from the type locality.

Its ascospores, which number eight per ascus, are 6–7-septate and measure 25–30 by 7–11 μm. No secondary chemicals were detected using thin-layer chromatography.

References

Peltigerales
Lichen species
Lichens described in 2010
Lichens of Tristan da Cunha